The Fourth Affiliated Hospital of Zhejiang University School of Medicine, also called the Yiwu Hospital, is a hospital in Yiwu, Zhejiang, China. It is a teaching hospital of Zhejiang University School of Medicine.

Introduction
The hospital is located in Yiwu, Zhejiang, China. The first investment of constructing this university hospital is about 1 billion yuan. Initially the hospital will have about 800 patient beds. The constructional area of the hospital is about 200 Mu. 

Dr. Chen Yagang was pointed as the first president of the hospital.

References

Hospitals under Zhejiang University School of Medicine
Hospitals in Zhejiang
Teaching hospitals in China